Dean Temius Francis (23 January 1974 – 25 May 2018) was a British professional boxer who competed from 1994 to 2014. He held the British super middleweight title from 1997 to 1998; the EBU European super middleweight title in 1997; the Commonwealth light heavyweight title from 2007 to 2008; and the British light heavyweight title in 2008.

Following a debilitating shoulder injury in 1998, Francis broke off his career, returning in 2002 and continuing to box until 2014. He was diagnosed with terminal cancer of the bowel in January 2017, and fought a sixteen month battle, before his death from the disease on 25 May 2018. He was 44 years old. Tributes paid by boxing promoters Barry Hearn and Eddie Hearn, as well as former world champions Tony Bellew and Anthony Crolla.  He was nicknamed "Star".

References

External links

Image - Dean Francis

1974 births
2018 deaths
Cruiserweight boxers
English male boxers
Light-heavyweight boxers
Sportspeople from Basingstoke
Super-middleweight boxers
Deaths from colorectal cancer
Deaths from cancer in England